Christoph Hochhäusler (born 10 July 1972) is a German film director and screenwriter. His film Falscher Bekenner was screened in the Un Certain Regard section at the 2005 Cannes Film Festival. His film The City Below was screened in the Un Certain Regard section at the 2010 Cannes Film Festival.

At the 73rd Berlin International Film Festival his 2023 film Till the End of the Night was one of the nominees for the Berlinale's Golden Bear. It received the Teddy Award for Best Feature Film, and one of the film's stars, Thea Ehre, received the Silver Bear for Best Supporting Performance.

Filmography
 Fieber (1998)
 Milchwald (2003)
 Falscher Bekenner (2005)
 Deutschland 09 – 13 kurze Filme zur Lage der Nation (2009)
 The City Below (2010)
 Dreileben: One Minute of Darkness (2011)
  (2014)
 Till the End of the Night (2023)

References

External links

1972 births
Living people
Film people from Munich